Insertion may refer to:
Insertion (anatomy), the point of a tendon or ligament onto the skeleton or other part of the body
Insertion (genetics), the addition of DNA into a genetic sequence
Insertion, several meanings in medicine, see ICD-10-PCS
Insertion loss, in electronics
Insertion reaction, a chemical reaction in which one chemical entity interposes itself into an existing bond of a second chemical entity (e.g.: A + B–C → B–A–C)
Insertion sort, a simple computer algorithm for sorting arrays
Local insertion, in broadcasting

See also
 Insert (disambiguation)